The Machineries of Joy (1964) is a collection of short stories by American writer Ray Bradbury.

Contents
 "The Machineries of Joy"
 "The One Who Waits"
 "Tyrannosaurus Rex"
 "The Vacation"
 "The Drummer Boy of Shiloh"
 "Boys! Raise Giant Mushrooms in Your Cellar"
 "Almost the End of the World"
 "Perhaps We Are Going Away"
 "And the Sailor, Home From Sea"
 "El Día de Muertos"
 "The Illustrated Woman"
 "Some Live Like Lazarus"
 "A Miracle of Rare Device"
 "And So Died Riabouchinska"
 "The Beggar on O'Connell Bridge"
 "Death and the Maiden"
 "A Flight of Ravens"
 "The Best of All Possible Worlds"
 "The Lifework of Juan Díaz"
 "To the Chicago Abyss"
 "The Anthem Sprinters"

References

Sources

External links
 
 

1964 short story collections
Short story collections by Ray Bradbury
Simon & Schuster books